Daniel Orlando Díaz Muñoz (born 7 August 1948) is a former Chilean footballer who played in 4 clubs of Chile and the Chile national team.

Teams
  Universidad Católica 1968-1971
  Huachipato 1972-1976
  Colo Colo 1977-1982
  Rangers 1982
  Moroka Swallows 1983

International
Díaz represented Chile at under-20 level in the 1967 South American Championship. 

At senior level, he made 23 appearances for Chile national team, including the 1975 Copa América.

Titles
  Huachipato 1974 (Chilean Primera División Championship)
  Colo Colo 1979 and 1981 (Chilean Primera División Championship), 1981 and 1982 (Copa Chile)

References

External links
 
 Daniel Díaz at PlaymakerStats
 Daniel Díaz at PartidosdeLaRoja

1948 births
Living people
Footballers from Santiago
Chilean footballers
Chilean expatriate footballers
Chile international footballers
Chile under-20 international footballers
Chilean Primera División players
Colo-Colo footballers
C.D. Huachipato footballers
Club Deportivo Universidad Católica footballers
Rangers de Talca footballers
Moroka Swallows F.C. players
Chilean expatriate sportspeople in South Africa
Expatriate soccer players in South Africa
1975 Copa América players
Association football defenders